Banerjee (born Maganti Venu Banerjee) is an Indian actor who primarily works in Telugu films. He has over 40 years of experience in films. He is the son of character actor Maganti Raghavaiah. Banerjee started his career as an assistant director. He played antagonistic and supporting roles in many films.

Early life
He is born in Vijayawada, Governorpeta. He studied in Montessori children school headed by Vege Koteswaramma. His father was an official in Information and broadcasting ministry. As he was transferred to Delhi, he stayed in Delhi for some time. He completed his intermediate education in A.C College in Guntur. After that he did Hotel management course in Chennai. He also completed B.A in Chennai. Later he worked as branch manager in a company in Vizianagaram. He has an elder sister who lives in Chennai. He lives with his wife and daughter in Hyderabad.

Career
He first started working in films with U. Visweswara Rao.

Filmography

{{columns-list|colwidth=22em|
 Harischandrudu (1982)
    Inquilaab (1984 - Hindi)
 Nyayam Meere Cheppali (1985)
 Naan Sigappu Manithan (1985 - Tamil)
 Aalaapana (1985)
 Surya Chandra (1985)
 Vikram (1986 - Tamil)
 Nalla Trachu (1987)
 Enga Veetu Dheivam (1989 - Tamil)
 Jaitra Yatra (1991)
 Parishkaram
 Pandandi Jeevitham
 Killer (1992)
 Rakshana (1993)
 Gaayam (1993)
 One by Two (1993)
 Theerpu (1994)
 Gulabi (1995)
 Little Soldiers (1996)
 Ninne Pelladata (1996)
 Bombay Priyudu (1996)
 Preminchukundam Raa (1997)
 Priyaragalu (1997)
 Sri Sitaramula Kalyanam Chootamu Raarandi (1998)
 Suryavamsam (1998)
 Satya (1998)   Hindi Movie
 Seetharama Raju (1999)
 Nee Kosam (1999)
 Chitram (2000)
 Azad (2000)
 Jayam Manadera (2000)
 Avunu Valliddaru Ista Paddaru! (2001)
 Nuvvu Nenu (2001)
 Adhipati (2001)
 Anandam (2001)
 Subbu (2001)
 Naga Pratista (2002)
 Friends (2002)
 Holi (2002)
 Santosham (2002)
 Hai (2002)
 Dhanalakshmi, I Love You (2002)
 Ee Abbai Chala Manchodu (2003)
 Juniors (2003)
 Yeh Dil (2003)
 Ottesi Cheputunna (2003)
 Appudappudu (2003)
 Oka Raju Oka Rani (2003)
 Sambaram (2003)
 Anaganaga O Kurraadu (2003)
 Sivamani (2003)
 Nenu Pelliki Ready (2003)
 Pranam (2003)
 Gangotri (2003)
 Andhrawala (2004)
 Malliswari (2004)
 Nenu (2004)
 Andaru Dongale Dorikite (2004)
 Satta (2004)
 Adavi Ramudu (2004)
 Swamy (2004)
 Gowri (2004)
 Shankar Dada MBBS (2004)
 Apparao Driving School (2004)
 Chanti (2004)
 Sakhiya (2004)
 Allari Pidugu (2005)
 Orey Pandu (2005)
 Nireekshana (2005)
 Nayakudu (2005)
 Sri (2005)
 Maa Iddari Madhya (2005)
 Samanyudu (2006)
 Swagatam (2008)
 Andamaina Manasulo (2008)
 Bommana Brothers Chandana Sisters (2008)
 Konchem Kothaga (2008)
 Three (2008)
 Gorintaku (2008)
 Kick (2009)
 Sankham (2009)
 Samardhudu (2009)
 Jayeebhava (2009)
 Saleem (2009)
 Maa Nanna Chiranjeevi (2010)
 Namo Venkatesa (2010)
 Bindaas (2010)
 Rama Rama Krishna Krishna (2010)
 Panchakshari (2010)
 Pappu (2010)
 Don Seenu (2010)
 Ragada (2010)
 Broker (2010)
 Wanted (2011)
 Vastadu Naa Raju (2011)
 Mr. Perfect (2011)
 Oosaravelli (2011)
 Backbench Student (2013)
 Mirchi (2013)
 1 (2014)
 Jump Jilani (2014)
 Drushyam (2014)
 Intelligent Idiots (2015)
 James Bond (2015)
 Hitudu (2015)
 Eedu Gold Ehe (2016)
 Janatha Garage (2016)
 Mister (2017)
 Rarandoi Veduka Chudham (2017)
 Samanthakamani (2017)
 Raja the Great (2017)
 Rangasthalam (2018)
 Tenali Ramakrishna BA. BL(2018)
 Tej I Love You (2018)
 Bharat Ane Nenu (2018)
 Raktham - The Blood (2019)
 Thipparaa Meesam (2019)
 IIT Krishnamurthy (2020)
 Poratam (2020)
 Khiladi (2022)
 Aadavallu Meeku Johaarlu (2022)Like, Share & Subscribe (2022)
}}

 Television 

 9 Hours'' (2022; Disney+ Hotstar)

References

External links

Telugu male actors
Male actors in Telugu cinema
Male actors from Vijayawada
Indian male film actors
20th-century Indian male actors
21st-century Indian male actors
People from Krishna district